Úbeda is a municipality of Spain located in the province of Jaén, Andalusia.

The town lies on the southern ridge of the so-called Loma de Úbeda, a table sandwiched in between the Guadalquivir and the Guadalimar river beds.

Both this town and the neighbouring Baeza benefited from extensive patronage in the early 16th century resulting in the construction of a series of Renaissance style palaces and churches, which have been preserved ever since. In 2003, UNESCO declared the historic centres and landmarks of these two towns a World Heritage Site. As of 2017, the municipality has a registered population of 34,733, ranking it as the fourth most populated municipality in the province.

History
Recent archaeological findings indicate a pre-Roman settlement at Úbeda, such as argaric and iberic remains.  The capital of the iberic state was called Iltiraka and was located over the Guadalquivir river, 10 km south of the actual site of the town.  Romans and later Visigoths occupied the site as a settlement.

During the Reconquista, in 1233, King Ferdinand III conquered the city to the Kingdom of Castile. As part of Castille the possession of territories of Úbeda increased substantially, including the area from Torres de Acún (Granada) to Santisteban del Puerto, passing by cities like Albánchez de Úbeda, Huesa and Canena, and, in the middle of the 16th century it also included Cabra del Santo Cristo, Quesada or Torreperogil. 

During the 14th and the 15th centuries, the differences between the local nobility and population impaired the growth of the town. In 1368, the city was damaged during the Castilian Civil War between Peter I of Castile and Henry II of Castile. This, combined with other circumstances, caused the worsening of the rivalry between the families de Trapera and de Aranda at first, and the families de la Cueva and de Molina after. This political instability was solved when the Catholic Monarchs ruled: they ordered the Alcázar, used by the nobility as a fortress, was destroyed.

Úbeda, on the border between Granada and Castile-La Mancha, was an important geographic buffer, and thus the population gained from the Castilian kings, a number of official privileges, such as the "Fuero de Cuenca", which organized the population formed by people from Castilla and from León, in order to face the problems that there could be in the borders. Through the "Fuero de Cuenca", a popular Council was formed, which developed a middle-class nobility, which made the high-ranking official hereditary.

During the 16th century, these important Castilian aristocratic families from Úbeda reached top positions in the Spanish Monarchy administration. Notably, Francisco de los Cobos and his nephew Juan Vazquez de Molina became Secretary of State for Holy Roman Emperor Charles V and Philip II respectively. The Viceroy of Peru Pedro de Toledo, the governor of the Canary Islands Juan de Rivera y Zambrana, the Marquis of Messia or the Count of Guadiana are other examples of nobiliary families living in Úbeda at the time. Due to the patronage of arts of these competing families, Úbeda became a Renaissance focus in Spain and from there Renaissance architecture spread to the Kingdom of Seville and America.

The Holy Chapel of the Saviour of the World and Vazquez de Molina Palace, today the Council Town, were designed by the architects Diego de Siloé, Berruguete, and Andrés de Vandelvira, among others. This thriving period ended because of the 17th crisis. The last years of the 18th century, the town started to recover its economy, with the help of the agriculture and handmade industries.

In the early 19th century the War of Independence (this war against Napoleon is often called the "Peninsular War" in English) produced huge economic losses again, and the city did not boost until the end of the 19th century, when several technical improvements were applied in agriculture an industry. Ideological discussions took place at the "casinos", places for informal discussions about several items.

Economy
The city is near the geographic centre of the province of Jaén, and it is the administrative seat of the surrounding Loma de Úbeda comarca. It is one of the region's most important settlements, boasting a regional hospital, university bachelor's degree in education college, distance-learning facilities, local government facilities, social security offices, and courts. According to the Caixa yearbook, it is the economic hub of a catchment area with a population of 200,000 inhabitants. Twenty-nine percent of employment is in the service sector. Other fractions of the population are employed in tourism, commerce, industry, and local government administration. The agricultural economy mainly works with olive cultivation and cattle ranching. Úbeda has become in one of the biggest olive oil's producers and packers of the Jaén province.

One of the main seasonal attractions of the town is the annual music and dance festival which is held in May and June including opera, jazz, flamenco, chamber music, symphony orchestra and dance. Just southeast of the town lies the nature park of Sierra de Cazorla, Segura y las Villas.

Main sights
The most outstanding feature of the city is the monumental Vázquez de Molina Square, surrounded with imposing Renaissance buildings such as the Palacio de las Cadenas (so named for the decorative chains which once hung from the façade) and the Basílica de Santa María de los Reales Alcázares. The Chapel of the Savior or Capilla del Salvador was constructed to house the tombs of local nobility. Both the interior and exterior are decorated; for example, the interior has elaborate metalwork screen by the ironworker Bartolomé de Jaen. The Hospital de Santiago, designed by Vandelvira in the late 16th century, with its square bell towers and graceful Renaissance courtyard, is now the home of the town's Conference Hall. Úbeda has a Parador hotel, housed in a 16th-century palace which was the residence of a high-ranking churchman of that period.

The town lends its name to a common idiom in Spanish, andar por los cerros de Úbeda (literally 'to walk around the hills of Úbeda'), meaning 'to go off at a tangent'.

The city possesses 48 monuments, and more of another hundred of buildings of interest, almost all of them of Renaissance style. All this patrimony led Úbeda to being the second city of renowned Spain Historical – artistic Set, in the year 1955. In the year 1975 it received the appointment of the Council of Europe as Exemplary City of the Renaissance. Finally, in 2003 it was named a World Heritage Site, together with Baeza, by UNESCO.

Sister cities
 Chiclana de la Frontera, Spain.
 Lège-Cap-Ferret, France.

People
Ruy López Dávalos Count of Ribadeo since it was sold by the first count, the Frenchman Pierre de Villaines, who received it from Henry II of Castile on 20 December 1369, Adelantado of Murcia, 1396, Constable of Castile, 1400–1423, during the reigns of kings Henry III of Castile and John II of Castile.
Beltrán de la Cueva, 1st Duke of Alburquerque,nobleman who is said to have fathered Joan, the daughter of Henry IV of Castile wife Joan of Portugal.
Francisco de los Cobos, Charles the Fifth's Secretary of State.
Diego de los Cobos Molina, Roman Catholic prelate who served as Bishop of Jaén (1560–1565) and Bishop of Ávila (1559–1560).
Arsenio Moreno Mendoza was a Spanish writer, academic, and politician.
Joaquín Sabina, writer, poet and singer.
Antonio Muñoz Molina, writer who won Prince of Asturias Award of literature category.
Saint John of The Cross, mystic poet.
Zahara (Spanish Musician), singer-songwriter.
Carlos Muñoz (footballer, born 1961), former professional football player.
José Luis Villacañas, political philosopher and historian of politic ideas.
Juan Pizarro Navarrete, physician and politician.

References

External links
 Virtual Guide to Úbeda (municipal council website)
 Renaissance Monumental Ensembles of Úbeda and Baeza (UN World Heritage website)
 Histories of Úbeda  
 eGuide to Úbeda
 Ubeda's updated statistics

 
Municipalities in the Province of Jaén (Spain)
World Heritage Sites in Spain